Béla Bakosi (born 18 June 1957) is a retired triple jumper from Hungary. He won six medals at the European Indoor Championships and a bronze medal at the 1982 European Championships in Athletics.

Achievements

External links

1957 births
Living people
Hungarian male triple jumpers
Athletes (track and field) at the 1980 Summer Olympics
Athletes (track and field) at the 1988 Summer Olympics
Olympic athletes of Hungary
European Athletics Championships medalists
Universiade medalists in athletics (track and field)
Universiade silver medalists for Hungary
Medalists at the 1981 Summer Universiade